Geek Retreat is a chain of franchised combined shops and board game cafés in the United Kingdom. The venues offer food, drink, and have various items for sale, while also providing a space to play board games, console games and trading card games. The venues also hold regular events.

History 
The company opened its first venue in Glasgow in 2013. Its second venue opened the following year in Newcastle upon Tyne. It joined the British Franchise Association in 2021. In June 2021, it had 27 venues.They applied for a liquidation of the company in November 2022, which is currently being resolved as of January 2023.

Business model 
The individual venues are franchised. Entry is free and guests are asked to purchase food and drink.

Locations 
 Aberdeen, opened 2022
 Barnsley, opened 2022
 Bedford, opened August 2021
Blackburn, opened June 2021
Bournemouth, (now closed)
Bradford, (Now closed)
Bury, opened December 2020
Chelmsford
Daventry, opened October 2021 (Now closed)
Dumfries, opened July 2021 (Now closed)
Exeter, opened May 2021 (Now closed)
Glasgow, opened 2013
Harrogate
Hereford, opened 2021
Ipswich, opened October 2021
Kidderminster, opened 2021
Leeds
Leicester, opened April 2021
Lincoln, opened August 2021 (Now closed)
Lisburn, (Northern Ireland) opened March 24th 2021 (closed 10th July 2022, reopened under new management 1st October 2022)
Llandudno, opened March 2021
London Camberwell (Now closed)
London Holloway
Middlesbrough, opened January 2020 (Now closed)
Milton Keynes, opened 2021, closed December 2022
Motherwell, opened November 2019
Newcastle upon Tyne, opened 2014
Northampton, opened October 2020 (now closed)
Northwich, opened August 2021
Nottingham, opened November 2020 (now closed)
Oxford, opened August 2021 (Now closed)
Portsmouth, opened July 2021
Reigate, opened march 2022 (now closed)
Rotherham, opened Dec 2021 
Southampton, opened 2021
St Helens, opened October 2021 (Now closed)
Sunderland, opened April 2021
Torquay, opened March 2022. Changed ownership December 2022 
Truro, opened May 2021
Wakefield, opened April 2021
Wirral, opened 2019
Loughborough, opened February 2022 (now closed)

References 

Retail companies of the United Kingdom
2013 establishments in Scotland
Board game cafés